Admiral Sir George Price Webley Hope,  (11 October 1869 – 11 July 1959) was a Royal Navy officer who went on to become Deputy First Sea Lord during World War I.

Naval career

Hope joined the Royal Navy. He was promoted to commander on 30 June 1900. In July 1902 he was appointed in command of the light cruiser , which served in the Mediterranean Fleet.

Hope served in the First World War. He was appointed Flag Captain to the Commander-in-Chief of the Eastern Mediterranean Squadron, as well as Aide-de-Camp to King George V, in 1915, Director of the Operations Division at the Admiralty in 1916 and Deputy First Sea Lord in 1918.

He was present at the signing of the Armistice with Germany on 11 November 1918. After the War, he was promoted to vice-admiral on 26 November 1920, and became Commander of the 3rd Light Cruiser Squadron. From 1923 he was President of the Royal Naval College, Greenwich. He served as Chairman (1925-1951) of the Society for Nautical Research and its President (1936-1951).

Family
In 1899, he married Arabella Phillippa Sams.

References

External links
 

1869 births
1959 deaths
Royal Navy admirals of World War I
Knights Commander of the Order of the Bath
Knights Commander of the Order of St Michael and St George
Admiral presidents of the Royal Naval College, Greenwich
Lords of the Admiralty